Alin Dorinel Toșca (born 14 March 1992) is a Romanian professional footballer who plays as a left-back or a centre-back for Italian  club Benevento.

Club career

Early career
Born in Alexandria, Teleorman County, Toșca came through FC Steaua București's youth system and made his professional debut with its reserve team. He was loaned out to Unirea Urziceni where he played his first Liga I match on 11 September 2010, against Steaua.

Toșca also had a brief spell with Săgeata Năvodari before joining Viitorul Constanța in 2012, with whom he made over 50 appearances.

Steaua București
In March 2014, it was announced that FC Steaua București signed Toșca for an undisclosed fee, with the player due to join the squad in the summer. He scored his first competitive goal for the club on 14 December 2014, contributing to a 3–0 away win over Politehnica Iași for the season's Cupa Ligii.

Betis
On 24 January 2017, Toșca moved to Spanish side Real Betis on a five-year deal for an undisclosed fee. He made his La Liga debut five days later, featuring the full 90 minutes against Barcelona in a 1–1 home draw.

After falling down the pecking order, Toșca agreed to a five-month loan deal with Italian club Benevento on 31 January 2018. On 24 August 2018, he was loaned to Greek first division club PAOK for the 2018–19 campaign with a purchase option.

Gaziantep
On 21 July 2019, after being released by Betis, he signed a two-year contract with Turkish side Gazişehir Gaziantep.

Return to Benevento
On 30 January 2023, Toșca signed with Benevento in Italy once again.

International career
Toșca earned his first cap for Romania on 23 March 2016, coming on as a late substitute in a 1–0 friendly win against Lithuania, in Giurgiu.

Career statistics

Club

International

Scores and results list Romania's goal tally first, score column indicates score after each Toșca goal.

Honours
Steaua București
Liga I: 2014–15
Cupa României: 2014–15
Cupa Ligii: 2014–15, 2015–16
Supercupa României runner-up: 2014, 2015 

PAOK
Super League Greece: 2018–19
Kypello Elladas: 2018–19

References

External links

1992 births
Living people
People from Alexandria, Romania
Romanian footballers
Association football defenders
Liga I players
Liga II players
FC Steaua II București players
FC Unirea Urziceni players
FC Viitorul Constanța players
AFC Săgeata Năvodari players
FC Steaua București players
La Liga players
Real Betis players
Serie A players
Serie B players
Benevento Calcio players
Super League Greece players
PAOK FC players
Süper Lig players
Gaziantep F.K. footballers
Romania under-21 international footballers
Romania international footballers
Romanian expatriate footballers
Expatriate footballers in Spain
Expatriate footballers in Italy
Expatriate footballers in Greece
Expatriate footballers in Turkey
Romanian expatriate sportspeople in Spain
Romanian expatriate sportspeople in Italy
Romanian expatriate sportspeople in Greece
Romanian expatriate sportspeople in Turkey